FC Bilshovyk Kyiv or Bolshevik Kiev was an amateur Soviet Ukrainian football club from Kyiv.

Overview
First mentioning of the team could be found for 1936 as a participant of the Soviet Cup. The team belonged to the Kyiv factory "Bilshovyk". After that it was not until after the World War II when the club consistently competes in Ukrainian republican competitions and later Ukrainian competitions among KFK (amateur level). In 1950s soon after the death of Stalin, in 1954-57 the club carried name of Torpedo Kyiv.

In 1978 Bolshevik lost final of the Soviet Cup among KFK teams to Zaria Kaluga on penalties 0–0 .

Honours
 Soviet Cup among KFK teams
Runners-up (1): 1978

 Ukrainian championship among KFK teams
Runners-up (1): 1978

 Ukrainian Cup among KFK teams
Winners (3): 1964, 1967, 1978

League and cup history
{|class="wikitable"
|-bgcolor="#efefef"
! Season
! Div.
! Pos.
! Pl.
! W
! D
! L
! GS
! GA
! P
!Ukrainian Cup
!colspan=2|Europe
!Notes
|-
|align=center|1985
|align=center|4th "3"
|align=center|5
|align=center|14
|align=center|5
|align=center|1
|align=center|8
|align=center|13
|align=center|29
|align=center|11
|align=center|
|align=center|
|align=center|
|align=center|
|-
|colspan=14 align=center| in 1986 no record
|-
|align=center|1987
|align=center|4th "4"
|align=center|6
|align=center|16
|align=center|3
|align=center|4
|align=center|9
|align=center|14
|align=center|27
|align=center|10
|align=center|
|align=center|
|align=center|
|align=center|
|-
|align=center|1988
|align=center|4th "4"
|align=center|10
|align=center|20
|align=center|4
|align=center|6
|align=center|10
|align=center|31
|align=center|40
|align=center|14
|align=center|
|align=center|
|align=center|
|align=center|
|-
|align=center|1989
|align=center|4th "4"
|align=center|13
|align=center|24
|align=center|1
|align=center|2
|align=center|21
|align=center|13
|align=center|74
|align=center|4
|align=center|
|align=center|
|align=center|
|align=center|
|-
|align=center|1990
|align=center|4th "3"
|align=center|16
|align=center|30
|align=center|2
|align=center|4
|align=center|24
|align=center|21
|align=center|66
|align=center|8
|align=center|
|align=center|
|align=center|
|align=center|
|}

Coaches
 1952–1952 Aleksandr Prints
 1954–1957 Konstantin Shchegodskiy
 1970–1971 Lazar Koval

References

External links
 Bilshovyk Kyiv. Footballfacts.ru

Football clubs in Kyiv
Defunct football clubs in Ukraine